1602 was a year of the Gregorian and Julian calendar

1602 may refer to:

1602, the number 1602
Marvel 1602, a comic book limited series published by Marvel Comics
Anno 1602, a computer game
A postal code of Vlezenbeek in Belgium
1602 standard LCD display, a 16 character, 2 row, standard LCD display
 Mostly using HD44780 LCD controller